The 2013 Tajik League started on 6 April 2013 and ended on 17 November 2013.

Teams

League table

Top scorers

Hat-tricks

References

External links
Football federation of Tajikistan

Tajikistan Higher League seasons
1
Tajik
Tajik